The Sierra High Route (also called the Roper Route and the High Route) is a cross-country hiking route,  long, through the Sierra Nevada. It was scouted by Steve Roper and described by him in his book Sierra High Route: Traversing Timberline Country.

About a third of the route follows maintained hiking trails (including  of the John Muir Trail); the rest of the route traverses off-trail meadowlands, granite slabs, and, at high elevations, difficult loose-talus terrain. Hiking the route does not require advanced mountaineering skills, but the hiker occasionally encounters class-3 rock faces in which footholds and handholds must be carefully chosen and tested. The route requires the use of route descriptions, topographical maps, and one or more instruments (e.g., compass, GPS receiver) to navigate. Writes Roper in Sierra High Route,  "High Route adventurers will not be put off by the lack of an actual trail, since much of the singular joy of cross-country travel lies in wandering through the timberline country as the pioneers did--wondering what the next turn will reveal."

Roper divides the route into five segments:
 Cirque Country: Cedar Grove to Dusy Basin, traversing the Monarch Divide, Lake (Cartridge Creek) Basin, Upper Basin, Palisades Basin, Barrett Lakes Basin, and Dusy Basin.
 Whitebark Country: Dusy Basin to Lake Italy, through LeConte Canyon, Muir Pass, Evolution Basin, the Glacier Divide, Humphrey's Basin, and Bear Lakes Basin.
 Lake Country: Lake Italy to Devils Postpile by way of Bear Lakes Basin, Mono Lakes Basin, the Recesses, the Silver Divide, and the Mammoth Crest.
 Headwaters Country: Devil's Postpile to Tuolumne Meadows, crossing the Ritter Range and the Cathedral Range. Roper calls this "Headwaters Country" because the route crosses headwaters of the San Joaquin River.
 Canyon Country: Tuolumne Meadows to Twin Lakes through Yosemite's north country.

From south to north (the direction Roper recommends hiking it), the Sierra High Route passes through Kings Canyon National Park, the Inyo National Forest, and Yosemite National Park.

In 2006, Backpacker magazine editor Steve Howe hiked the entire Sierra High Route in one month.

External links 
 The Sierra High Route: A Journey at Timberline, Steve Roper recounts his discovery of the Sierra High Route
 Sierra High Route: Kings Canyon to the Second Recess, Roper's account of this trail segment
 Sierra High Route: Silver Divide to Rainbow Fall, Roper's description of this trail segment
 Podcast description of route

References

Hiking trails in California
Sierra Nevada (United States)
Long-distance trails in the United States